Hey Monea (stylized as Hey Monea! on early records) is a Canton, Ohio-based rock band that has been together since 2005. The band consists of Dan Monea on lead vocals/guitar/piano, Nate Monea on drums/vocals, Adam Orin on bass.

They won a competition through an international contest sponsored by the Hard Rock Cafe to open for Bruce Springsteen in London at the 2012 Hard Rock Calling festival. The 3 day festival also had performances from Soundgarden, Paul Simon, special appearance from Paul McCartney, John Fogerdy, Mars Volta, Tom Morello and Lady Antebellum.

The group has performed on Rock Boat XII in 2012.  They shared the stage on the cruise ship with bands: Sister Hazel, Vertical Horizon, Marc Broussard, Alternative Routes, Tim Brantley, Carbon Leaf, Freddy Jones Band, Michael Tolcher, Red Wanting Blue, Tony Lucca and many other acts.

In 2011 Hey Monea played on the Rombello cruise. They performed with: Slightly Stoopid, Michael Franti and Spearhead, G. Love and The Special Sauce, Citizen Cope, Brett Dennen among other bands.

Hey Monea currently has two albums out, their most recent one being Wine, "Women and Song." The album contains the single "The Ballad of Moonbeam Swiner." Their first album is called "Do You Wanna" and was under the name "Hooked On Tonics." Their newest record, "The Fifty" will be released on October 23, 2015.

References

Canton, Ohio